Cunjurong Point is a coastal town in New South Wales, Australia in the City of Shoalhaven.

References

Towns in New South Wales
City of Shoalhaven
Towns in the South Coast (New South Wales)
Coastal towns in New South Wales